A joint is a break (fracture) of natural origin in a layer or body of rock that lacks visible or measurable movement parallel to the surface (plane) of the fracture ("Mode 1" Fracture). Although joints can occur singly, they most frequently appear as joint sets and systems. A joint set is a family of parallel, evenly spaced joints that can be identified through mapping and analysis of their orientations, spacing, and physical properties. A joint system consists of two or more intersecting joint sets.

The distinction between joints and faults hinges on the terms visible or measurable, a difference that depends on the scale of observation. Faults differ from joints in that they exhibit visible or measurable lateral movement between the opposite surfaces of the fracture ("Mode 2" and "Mode 3" Fractures). Thus a joint may be created by either strict movement of a rock layer or body perpendicular to the fracture or by varying degrees of lateral displacement parallel to the surface (plane) of the fracture that remains "invisible" at the scale of observation.

Joints are among the most universal geologic structures, found in almost every exposure of rock. They vary greatly in appearance, dimensions, and arrangement, and occur in quite different tectonic environments. Often, the specific origin of the stresses that created certain joints and associated joint sets can be quite ambiguous, unclear, and sometimes controversial. The most prominent joints occur in the most well-consolidated, lithified, and highly competent rocks, such as sandstone, limestone, quartzite, and granite. Joints may be open fractures or filled by various materials. Joints infilled by precipitated minerals are called veins and joints filled by solidified magma are called dikes.

Formation 
Joints arise from brittle fracture of a rock or layer due to tensile stress. This stress may be imposed from outside; for example, by the stretching of layers, the rise of pore fluid pressure, or shrinkage caused by the cooling or desiccation of a rock body or layer whose outside boundaries remained fixed.

When tensional stresses stretch a body or layer of rock such that its tensile strength is exceeded, it breaks. When this happens the rock fractures in a plane parallel to the maximum principal stress and perpendicular to the minimum principal stress (the direction in which the rock is being stretched). This leads to the development of a single sub-parallel joint set. Continued deformation may lead to development of one or more additional joint sets. The presence of the first set strongly affects the stress orientation in the rock layer, often causing subsequent sets to form at a high angle, often 90°, to the first set.

Types 
Joints are classified by their geometry or by the processes that formed them.

By geometry 
The geometry of joints refers to the orientation of joints as either plotted on stereonets and rose-diagrams or observed in rock exposures. In terms of geometry, three major types of joints, nonsystematic joints, systematic joints, and columnar jointing are recognized.

Nonsystematic 
Nonsystematic joints are joints that are so irregular in form, spacing, and orientation that they cannot be readily grouped into distinctive, through-going joint sets.

Systematic 
Systematic joints are planar, parallel, joints that can be traced for some distance, and occur at regularly, evenly spaced distances on the order centimeters, meters, tens of meters, or even hundreds of meters. As a result, they occur as families of joints that form recognizable joint sets. Typically, exposures or outcrops within a given area or region of study contains two or more sets of systematic joints, each with its own distinctive properties such as orientation and spacing, that intersect to form well-defined joint systems.

Based upon the angle at which joint sets of systematic joints intersect to form a joint system, systematic joints can be subdivided into conjugate and orthogonal joint sets. The angles at which joint sets within a joint system commonly intersect is called by structural geologists as the dihedral angles. When the dihedral angles are nearly 90° within a joint system, the joint sets are known as orthogonal joint sets. When the dihedral angles are from 30 to 60° within a joint system, the joint sets are known as conjugate joint sets.

Within regions that have experienced tectonic deformation, systematic joints are typically associated with either layered or bedded strata that has been folded into anticlines and synclines. Such joints can be classified according to their orientation in respect to the axial planes of the folds as they often commonly form in a predictable pattern with respect to the hinge trends of folded strata. Based upon their orientation to the axial planes  and axes of folds, the types of systematic joints are:

 Longitudinal joints – Joints which are roughly parallel to fold axes and often fan around the fold.
 Cross-joints – Joints which are approximately perpendicular to fold axes.
 Diagonal joints – Joints which typically occur as conjugate joint sets that trend oblique to the fold axes. 
 Strike joints – Joints which trend parallel to the strike of the axial plane of a fold.
 Cross-strike joints – Joints which cut across the axial plane of a fold.

Columnar 
Columnar jointing is a distinctive type of joints that join together at triple junctions either at or about 120° angles. These joints split a rock body into long, prisms or columns.  Typically, such columns are hexagonal, although 3-, 4-, 5- and 7-sided columns are relatively common. The diameter of these prismatic columns range from a few centimeters to several metres. They are often oriented perpendicular to either the upper surface and base of lava flows and the contact of the tabular igneous bodies with the surrounding rock. This type of jointing is typical of thick lava flows and shallow dikes and sills. Columnar jointing is also known as either columnar structure, prismatic joints, or prismatic jointing. Rare cases of columnar jointing have also been reported from sedimentary strata.

By formation 
Joints can be classified according to their origin, under the labels of tectonics, hydraulics, exfoliation, unloading (release), and cooling. Different authors have proposed contradictory hypotheses for the same joint sets and types. And, joints in the same outcrop may form at different times under varied circumstances.

Tectonic 
Tectonic joints are joints formed when the relative displacement of the joint walls is normal to its plane as the result of brittle deformation of bedrock in response to regional or local tectonic deformation of bedrock. Such joints form when directed tectonic stress causes the tensile strength of 
bedrock to be exceeded as the result of the stretching of rock layers under conditions of elevated pore fluid pressure and directed tectonic stress. Tectonic joints often reflect local tectonic stresses associated with local folding and faulting. Tectonic joints occur as both nonsystematic and systematic joints, including orthogonal and conjugate joint sets.

Hydraulic 
Hydraulic joints are formed when pore fluid pressure becomes elevated as a result of vertical gravitational loading. In simple terms, the accumulation of either sediments, volcanic, or other material causes an increase in the pore pressure of groundwater and other fluids in the underlying rock when they cannot move either laterally or vertically in response to this pressure. This also causes an increase in pore pressure in  preexisting cracks that increases the tensile stress on them perpendicular to the minimum principal stress (the direction in which the rock is being stretched). If the tensile stress exceeds the magnitude of the least principal compressive stress the rock will fail in a brittle manner and these cracks propagate in a process called hydraulic fracturing. Hydraulic joints occur as both nonsystematic and systematic joints, including orthogonal and conjugate joint sets. In some cases, joint sets can be a tectonic - hydraulic hybrid.

Exfoliation 
Exfoliation joints are sets of flat-lying, curved, and large joints that are restricted to massively exposed rock faces in a deeply eroded landscape. Exfoliation jointing consists of fan-shaped fractures varying from a few meters to tens of meters in size that lie sub-parallel to the topography. The vertical, gravitational load of the mass of a mountain-size bedrock mass drives longitudinal splitting and causes outward buckling toward the free air. In addition, paleostress sealed in the granite before the granite was exhumed by erosion and released by exhumation and canyon cutting is also a driving force for the actual spalling.

Unloading 
Unloading joints or release joints arise near the surface when bedded sedimentary rocks are brought closer to the surface during uplift and erosion; when they cool, they contract and become relaxed elastically. A stress builds up which eventually exceeds the tensile strength of the bedrock and results in jointing. In the case of unloading joints, compressive stress is released either along preexisting structural elements (such as cleavage) or perpendicular to the former direction of tectonic compression.

Cooling 
Cooling joints are columnar joints that result from the cooling of either lava from the exposed surface of a lava lake or flood basalt flow or the sides of a tabular igneous, typically basaltic, intrusion. They exhibit a pattern of joints that join together at triple junctions either at or about 120° angles. They split a rock body into long, prisms or columns that are typically hexagonal, although 3-, 4-, 5- and 7-sided columns are relatively common. They form as a result of a cooling front that moves from some surface, either the exposed surface of a lava lake or flood basalt flow or the sides of a tabular igneous intrusion into either lava of the lake or lava flow or magma of a dike or sill.

Fractography 

Joint propagation can be studied through the techniques of fractography in which characteristic marks such as hackles and plumose structures are used to determine propagation directions and, in some cases, the principal stress orientations.

Shear fractures 
Some fractures that look like joints are actually shear fractures, which in effect are microfaults. They do not form as the result of the perpendicular opening of a fracture due to tensile stress, but through the shearing of fractures that causes lateral movement of the faces. Shear fractures can be confused with joints because the lateral offset of the fracture faces is not visible in the outcrop or in a specimen. Because of the absence of diagnostic ornamentation or the lack of any discernible movement or offset, they can be indistinguishable from joints. Such fractures occur in planar parallel sets at an angle of 60 degrees and can be of the same size and scale as joints. As a result, some "conjugate joint sets" might actually be shear fractures. Shear fractures are distinguished from joints by the presence of slickensides, the products of shearing movement parallel to the fracture surface. The slickensides are fine-scale, delicate ridge-in-groove lineations on the surface of fracture surfaces.

Importance 
Joints are important not only in understanding the local and regional geology and geomorphology but also in developing natural resources, in the safe design of structures, and in environmental protection. Joints have a profound control on weathering and erosion of bedrock. As a result, they exert a strong control on how topography and morphology of landscapes develop. Understanding the local and regional distribution, physical character, and origin of joints is a significant part of understanding the geology and geomorphology of an area. Joints often impart a well-develop fracture-induced permeability to bedrock. As a result, joints strongly influence, even control, the natural circulation (hydrogeology) of fluids, e.g. groundwater and pollutants within aquifers, petroleum in reservoirs, and hydrothermal circulation at depth, within bedrock. Thus, joints are important to the economic and safe development of petroleum, hydrothermal, and groundwater resources and the subject of intensive research relative to these resources. As a result, understanding their genesis, structure, chronology, and distribution is an important part of finding and profitably developing ore deposits. Finally, joints often form discontinuities that may have a large influence on the mechanical behavior (strength, deformation, etc.) of soil and rock masses in, for example, tunnel, foundation, or slope construction. As a result, joints are an important part of geotechnical engineering in practice and research.

See also

 Basalt fan structure
 Exfoliating granite
 Tessellated pavement

References

External links

Aydin, A., and J. Zhong  (nda) Non-orthogonal Joint Sets, Multiple Joint Sets,  Rock Fracture Knowledgebase, Stanford University, Stanford, California.
Aydin, A., and J. Zhong  (ndb) Orthogonal Joint Sets, Multiple Joint Sets, Rock Fracture Knowledgebase, Stanford University, Stanford, California.
Aydin, A., and J. Zhong  (ndb) Patterns of Multiple Joint Sets, Multiple Joint Sets, Rock Fracture Knowledgebase, Stanford University, Stanford, California.

Geology terminology
Petrology
Structural geology